JCS was a Filipino boy band formed by Star Magic. The group was named after the first initials of the members' names, John Prats, Carlo Aquino and Stefano Mori. Dubbed as "The Hanson Band of the Philippines", the band's music is joyous and lighthearted pop played with gumption that was similar to the band Hanson.

JCS (album)

JCS released their self-titled debut (to date, only) studio album in 2000. They supposed to make their second studio album the following year, however it was shelved as their bandmate Stefano Mori, leaved the showbiz industry. 

Aside from guitars and drums, violins and keyboards have a major role in the album, which are played by guest performers. Some of the songs are covers notably "Girl" and "I Should Have Known Better" by the Beatles and "Matamis Mong Oo", originally by Filipino rock band Bang Bang.

Track listing

References

Filipino boy bands
Filipino pop music groups
Musical groups from Quezon City
Musical groups established in 2000
Musical groups disestablished in 2002